Sándor Hajdú (born 21 January 1985 in Budapest) is a Hungarian football player who currently plays for MTK Hungária FC.

Career statistics

References
HLSZ 

1985 births
Living people
Footballers from Budapest
Hungarian footballers
Association football midfielders
Soroksári TE footballers
MTK Budapest FC players
Csákvári TK players
Nemzeti Bajnokság I players
21st-century Hungarian people